The 24th Secretariat of the Communist Party of the Soviet Union was elected by the 24th Central Committee in the aftermath of the 24th Congress.

List of members

References

Secretariat of the Central Committee of the Communist Party of the Soviet Union members
1971 establishments in the Soviet Union
1976 disestablishments in the Soviet Union